The St. Mark Church in St. Marks, Kansas is a historic Roman Catholic church building.  It was built in c.1903-1906 and added to the National Register of Historic Places in 1991.

The church is Romanesque Revival in style, built of rusticated limestone blocks. It has a copper roof and a three-story bell tower.

The church complex also includes a school (c. 1940), a rectory (c. 1951), a convent (c. 1953), and a cemetery.

References

External links 
 St. Mark the Evangelist Catholic Church website

Churches in Sedgwick County, Kansas
Churches on the National Register of Historic Places in Kansas
Roman Catholic churches completed in 1906
Churches in the Roman Catholic Diocese of Wichita
Romanesque Revival church buildings in Kansas
National Register of Historic Places in Sedgwick County, Kansas
1906 establishments in Kansas
20th-century Roman Catholic church buildings in the United States